Gajits Music Software, also known as Software Technology Ltd., was a software company based in Manchester, England. The company developed music software for the Atari ST and Commodore Amiga in the early 1990s.

Products
Sequencer One (Atari ST, Amiga; 1990) - MIDI sequencer
Sequencer One Plus (Atari ST, Amiga) - MIDI sequencer
Breakthru - MIDI sequencer
Breakthru Plus - MIDI sequencer
Sample Series - IFF format sample collection
CM-Panion - Editor/librarian for the Roland MT-32 and CM-series synthesizers
4D Companion - Editor/librarian for Roland D-series synthesizers
The Hit Kit! - MIDI sequence patterns

Influence
The Atari ST version of Sequencer One was used in the production of the number one single "Your Woman" by White Town.

References

Defunct software companies of the United Kingdom
Software companies of England